"Jenny Wren" is a song by Paul McCartney from his 2005 album Chaos and Creation in the Backyard. It was also released, in the United Kingdom on 21 November 2005, as the second single from the album.

Background
"Jenny Wren" was written in Los Angeles, and is about a character of the same name from Charles Dickens' 1865 novel Our Mutual Friend. It also refers to a bird known as the wren, which is reported to be McCartney's favourite. McCartney wrote the tune in the same sort of finger picking style found in "Blackbird", "Mother Nature's Son" (The Beatles) and "Calico Skies" (Flaming Pie). The song earned a nomination for the 2007 Grammy Award for Best Male Pop Vocal Performance category.

The solo is played on an Armenian woodwind instrument, called a duduk—a first in pop music history—played by Venezuelan-born world winds specialist and multi-instrumentalist Pedro Eustache. The guitar is tuned down a whole step for the song, providing a unique sound that reflects McCartney's earlier works.

As to who Jenny Wren is, McCartney said:

Recording
The song was recorded in October 2004, with duduk overdub added in a separate session on 25th of the same month.

Covers and references
The song has been covered by several artists, such as the Norwegian jazz trio SOLID! who recorded an instrumental version on their 2008 release Happy Accidents (AIM Records).

Track listing
Digital single released 31 October 2005
"Jenny Wren" (radio edit) – 2:09

7" R6678
"Jenny Wren" – 3:47
"Summer of '59" – 2:11

CD CDR6678
"Jenny Wren" – 3:47
"I Want You to Fly" – 5:03

Maxi-CD CDRS6678
"Jenny Wren" – 3:47
"I Want You to Fly" – 5:03
"This Loving Game" – 3:15

Chart positions

Personnel
Personnel per booklet.
Paul McCartney – vocals, Epiphone Texan acoustic guitar, Ludwig floor tom
Pedro Eustache – duduk

References

External links
Official site
Beatles.com.hk CD1 page (Hong Kong based)
Beatles.com.hk CD2 page (Hong Kong based)
Beatles.com.hk 7" page (Hong Kong based)
Beatles.com.hk digital single page (Hong Kong based)

Paul McCartney songs
2005 singles
Parlophone singles
Songs written by Paul McCartney
Song recordings produced by Nigel Godrich
2004 songs
Our Mutual Friend
Adaptations of works by Charles Dickens